The Bayer designation Tau Serpentis (τ Ser / τ Serpentis) is shared by a collection of eight stars, τ1 Serpentis through τ8 Serpentis, in the head of the constellation Serpens.  They are distributed within a box of size 40 minutes in right ascension by 3.5° in declination.  They are numbered by increasing right ascension:
 Tau1 Serpentis, also designated 9 Serpentis or HD 137471.
 Tau2 Serpentis, also designated 12 Serpentis or HD 138527.
 Tau3 Serpentis, also designated 15 Serpentis or HD 139074.
 Tau4 Serpentis, also designated 17 Serpentis or HD 139216.
 Tau5 Serpentis, also designated 18 Serpentis or HD 139225.
 Tau6 Serpentis, also designated 19 Serpentis or HD 140027.
 Tau7 Serpentis, also designated 22 Serpentis or HD 140232.
 Tau8 Serpentis, also designated 26 Serpentis or HD 140729.

Serpentis, Tau
Serpens (constellation)